Antonio Ramón María Trevín Lombán (born 27 February 1956) is a Spanish politician and academic. Trevín, a member of the Spanish Socialist Workers' Party (PSOE), served as the President of the Principality of Asturias from 18 June 1993 to 11 July 1995.

Before being the President of Asturias, Trevín served as mayor of Llanes from 1987 to 1993. Since 2011, he has served as a member of the Spanish Congress, representing Asturias.

References

1956 births
Presidents of the Principality of Asturias
Members of the 10th Congress of Deputies (Spain)
Spanish Socialist Workers' Party politicians
People from Avilés
Living people
Members of the 12th Congress of Deputies (Spain)